Permsky (masculine), Permskaya (feminine), or Permskoye (neuter) may refer to:
Perm Krai (Permsky krai), a federal subject of Russia
Permsky District, a district of Perm Krai, Russia
Perm Oblast (Permskaya oblast), a former federal subject of Russia
Permsky (Permskaya, Permskoye), name of several rural localities in Russia:
Permsky (rural locality), a settlement in Toguchinsky District of Novosibirsk Oblast
Permskaya (rural locality), a village in Omutninsky District of Kirov Oblast
Permskoye, a selo in Olginsky District of Primorsky Krai

See also
 Perm (disambiguation)